Bolton is a civil parish in the Eden District, Cumbria, England. It contains 14 buildings that are recorded in the National Heritage List for England. Of these, one is listed at Grade I, the highest of the three grades, two are at Grade II*, the middle grade, and the others are at Grade II, the lowest grade.  The parish contains the village of Bolton, and is otherwise rural.  The listed buildings comprise the former residence of the Bishops of Carlisle, now in ruins, a church and structures in the churchyard, houses in the village, a farmhouse and barn, a bridge, and a country house with associated structures.


Key

Buildings

References

Citations

Sources

Lists of listed buildings in Cumbria